"Humble and Kind" is a song written by Lori McKenna and first released by American country music singer Tim McGraw on January 20, 2016, as the second single from his fourteenth studio album, Damn Country Music. McKenna later recorded her rendition of the song for her eighth studio album, The Bird and the Rifle, released in July 2016. Among several other wins and nominations, the song won the award for Best Country Song at the 59th Annual Grammy Awards, "Video of the Year" at the 2016 CMT Music Awards, "Song of the Year" at 2016 CMA Awards and "Country Song of the Year" at 2016 American Music Awards. It has been certified platinum and reached the number one position on the country music charts in both Canada and the United States.

Production

The song was written by Lori McKenna. In an interview with CMT published in July 2016, McKenna revealed the song was written for her husband and their five kids and is her list of all the things she wanted to make sure she'd told them.

McGraw and frequent collaborator Byron Gallimore co-produced the song.

Lori McKenna version

On July 8, 2016, Lori McKenna released her rendition of "Humble and Kind" as a single from her album, The Bird and the Rifle, released on July 29, 2016.

Music video

McGraw released the video to the song on his Facebook page on January 21, 2016. At the time of the video release, the song was expected to be released as the second single from the album in early February. The video was the result of a brainstorm McGraw had while running on a treadmill and seeing a 30-second trailer for Oprah Winfrey's Belief series. After taking some initiative, McGraw got Winfrey to avail footage for the video. The video, which was directed by Wes Edwards, featured scenes from around the world from Winfrey's fall 2015 documentary series. The video won the top honor, "Video of the Year", at the 2016 CMT Music Awards.

Promotion
The song and video of "Humble and Kind" has its own website (http://stayhumbleandkind.com) intended to gather related stories about acts of kindness that have been shared with the hashtag #stayhumbleandkind. The day after the music video was released, Winfrey tweeted her approval of the video, saying "TIM, I love this song. Every word feels true." McGraw performed the song on the April 3, 2016 ACM Awards.

Book
A bound edition of "Humble and Kind" was released on May 17, 2016, in conjunction with graduation season by Hachette Books. In addition to the lyrics and illustrations, the book edition features an introduction by McGraw and an epilogue by McKenna. McGraw pledged his book proceeds to the Neighbor's Keeper Fund of the Community Foundation of Middle Tennessee.

Critical response
Chris Parton of Country Weekly described "Humble and Kind"'s video as "the touching, lump-in-your-throat" kind. Stephen L. Betts of Rolling Stone described the video as one that takes "universal scenes of faith and life and combines them with an understated performance from McGraw, captured by a 360-degree turntable lighting rig". According to Christina Vinson of Townsquare Media's blog site, The Boot, the video, which presents a song from the perspective of "a parent sending their child into the world", will resonate across a wide-ranging audience. McGraw, who has three daughters with his wife Faith Hill had just sent his oldest daughter off to college in the fall before the song was released.

Accolades

Commercial performance
"Humble and Kind" first entered Billboard's Hot Country Songs chart at No. 45 for chart dated February 6, 2016. In late March, the song became McGraw's fifty-second Top 10 country hit. Tim McGraw performed the song at the 2016 ACM Awards, which pushed its sales to 64,000 for the week, as well as the song's ranking to No. 1 on the Hot Country Songs, his 26th No. 1 on the chart.  
The single was certified Platinum by the Recording Industry Association of America on September 20, 2016.  The song reached its million sales mark in December 2016, and has sold 1,380,000 copies in the US as of November 2019.

Charts and certifications

Weekly charts

Year-end charts

Certifications

References

2015 songs
2016 singles
Tim McGraw songs
Big Machine Records singles
Songs written by Lori McKenna
Song recordings produced by Byron Gallimore
Song recordings produced by Tim McGraw
Music videos directed by Wes Edwards